Presque Isle Downs & Casino is a casino and horse racing track near Erie, Pennsylvania, owned and operated by Churchill Downs Inc.

History
The developer, MTR Gaming Group, broke ground in October 2005 for the new facility, which opened on February 28, 2007.

Simulcasting was transferred from its former upper Peach Street location and became operational in August 2007.

In January 2019, Eldorado Resorts (the successor of MTR Gaming) sold the property to Churchill Downs Inc. for $178.9 million.

Description
The casino contains 1,500 slot machines. The  oval track opened on September 2, 2007. The racing surface is the synthetic material Tapeta Footings (a mixture of sand, rubber, fiber with a wax coating).

Gaming revenue is split between the operator (45%) and the Commonwealth of Pennsylvania (55%), the latter of which will use the funds for property tax relief, economic development and tourism, and the horse racing industry.  Revenue from table games goes to the state's general fund and the local government. Presque Isle Downs & Casino now operates table games, along with 1,600 slot machines.

On February 6, 2019, the Pennsylvania Gaming Control Board approved a sports betting license for Presque Isle Downs & Casino. The casino will construct a sportsbook and will also offer 50 self-betting kiosks. The BetAmerica self-betting kiosks began operation on August 9, 2019. On December 16, 2019, a three-day soft launch began for the BetAmerica online sportsbook. The full launch of the BetAmerica online sportsbook occurred on December 19, 2019.

Graded events
 
The following Graded events were held at Presque Isle Downs in 2019.

Grade II

Presque Isle Downs Masters Stakes

Other Stakes

 Presque Isle Mile
 Tom Ridge Stakes
 Satin and Lace Stakes
 Karl Boyes Memorial Stakes
 The HPBA Stakes
 Fitz Dixon, JR. Memorial Juvenile Stakes

See also
Gambling in Pennsylvania

References

External links
 

Buildings and structures in Erie County, Pennsylvania
Horse racing venues in Pennsylvania
Sports venues in Pennsylvania
Sports in Erie, Pennsylvania
Casinos in Pennsylvania
Sports venues completed in 2007
Tourist attractions in Erie County, Pennsylvania
Churchill Downs Incorporated